Okama is a Japanese manga artist and illustrator. He is known as the artist of Cloth Road as well as the original character designer for Himawari and Glass no Kantai. He was also involved in Gunbuster 2, most noticeably in the ending design.

Okama began his career by publishing various dōjin works (usually hentai themed), and made his debut in the professional world in 1998, with most of his early work also being hentai erotica themed. In late 1999, he began his first non-adult orientated serialization Cat's World.

Okama also means a gay, effeminate or female-presenting man. The artist's explanation for his name is that he always plays female characters in online games.

Works

Anime
Kamichu! (production design)
Glass no Kantai (original character design)
The Wings of Rean (visual concept)
Le Portrait de Petite Cossette (production design)
Genesis of Aquarion (concept design)
Diebuster (future visual)
Himawari! (original character design, production design)
Getsumen to Heiki Mina (character design)
Saint October (original character design)
Rebuild of Evangelion (design)
Welcome to the Space Show (production design)
Lotte no Omocha! (world visual design)
Senki Zesshō Symphogear (creature design)

Printed works
Artbooks
 Okamax
 Getsumen Toheiki Mina Calendar
 okamarble
 Food Girls
Manga
 Cat's World
 Cloth Road
 Food Girls
 Our Last Crusade or the Rise of a New World
 Tail Star
Hentai manga
 Hanafuda
 School
 Meguri Kuru Haru
Contributions
 Range Murata - Robot - Volume 01
 Range Murata - Robot - Volume 03
 Range Murata - Robot - Volume 04
 Range Murata - Robot - Volume 10

Games
No More Heroes (Costume Designer)
Busou Shinki (Designer for Zyrdarya and Juvisy)

Software
Vocaloid Nekomura Iroha (character design and illustration)

References

External links
  
 Okama at Media Arts Database 

Manga artists
Japanese illustrators
Hentai doujin creators
1974 births
Living people